Gerald Rufus Isaacs, 2nd Marquess of Reading  (10 December 1889 – 19 September 1960), styled Viscount Erleigh from 1917 to 1935, was a British barrister and Liberal then Conservative politician.

Background and education
Gerald Rufus Isaacs was the son of Rufus Isaacs, 1st Marquess of Reading, and Alice Edith Cohen. He was educated at Rugby School and Balliol College, Oxford. He served in the First World War, earning the Military Cross in the 1918 Birthday Honours and reaching the rank of lieutenant colonel. His book The South Sea Bubble which describes the famous speculative boom and crash of shares in 18th century England, was published in 1933.

Political career
Erleigh followed his father into Liberal politics. He stood as Liberal candidate for Blackburn at the 1929 General Election. He succeeded his father as second Marquess of Reading in 1935. When the Conservatives came to power in 1951 under Winston Churchill, he was appointed Joint Parliamentary Under-Secretary of State for Foreign Affairs, a post he held until 1953, when he was promoted to Minister of State for Foreign Affairs and admitted to the Privy Council. He retained this position when Sir Anthony Eden became Prime Minister in 1955. However, Reading was not included in the administration formed by Harold Macmillan in January 1957 and never returned to ministerial office. Apart from his political career, he was also a Bencher and Treasurer of the Middle Temple and an Honorary Colonel in the Inns of Court Regiment from 1947 to 1959. He was first Chairman of the Council on Tribunals serving from its inception in December 1958 until his death. He was succeeded by Gwilym Lloyd George, son of David Lloyd George.

Family
Lord Reading married the Honourable Eva Violet Mond in 1914, daughter of Alfred Moritz Mond, 1st Baron Melchett (1868–1930) and Violet Mond, Baroness Melchett (1867–1945). Eva Violet Mond's grandfather, Ludwig Mond (1839–1909), was a chemist and industrialist who created the Mond process to extract and purify nickel. He died in September 1960, aged 70, and was cremated at Golders Green Crematorium. His ashes, like those of his father, are buried in the Golders Green Jewish Cemetery.

He was succeeded in his titles by his son Michael. The Marchioness of Reading died in 1973.

In 1939, Lord Reading's daughter, Lady Joan Rufus Isaacs, was a painter who married the scientist Solly Zuckerman, Baron Zuckerman, OM, KCB, FRS (1904–1993). She died in 2000.

References

 Kidd, Charles, Williamson, David (editors). Debrett's Peerage and Baronetage (1990 edition). New York: St Martin's Press, 1990.
 

1889 births
1960 deaths
Alumni of Balliol College, Oxford
British Army personnel of World War I
Burials at Golders Green Jewish Cemetery
Conservative Party (UK) hereditary peers
English Jews
English people of German descent
English people of German-Jewish descent
English people of Portuguese-Jewish descent
Jewish British politicians
Liberal Party (UK) parliamentary candidates
2
Members of the Inner Temple
Members of the Privy Council of the United Kingdom
Ministers in the Eden government, 1955–1957
Ministers in the third Churchill government, 1951–1955
People educated at Rugby School
Recipients of the Military Cross